Rodrigo Facundo De Ciancio (born 30 March 1995) is an Argentine professional footballer who plays as a midfielder for Italian club Picerno.

Career
After being an unused substitute for San Lorenzo during a defeat to Arsenal de Sarandí on 12 March 2016, De Ciancio was selected for his career debut a month later for a Copa Libertadores encounter with L.D.U. Quito. His first league appearance for the club arrived in the following October against Newell's Old Boys. July 2017 saw De Ciancio join fellow Argentine Primera División side Temperley on loan. Eight appearances into his spell with Temperley, he scored the opening goal of his senior career versus Argentinos Juniors on 2 December. On 30 July 2018, Platense of Primera B Nacional loaned De Ciancio.

July 2019 saw De Ciancio leave San Lorenzo permanently to join second tier team Atlanta. He appeared just seven times for the club, six of which came off the bench, in a season that was curtailed due to the COVID-19 pandemic. On 2 October 2020, De Ciancio was unveiled as a new signing for Italian Serie C outfit Sambenedettese. He made his debut during a 1–1 draw at home to Fermana on 7 October.

On 10 August 2021, he signed with Picerno in Serie C.

Career statistics
.

References

External links

1995 births
Living people
Footballers from Buenos Aires
Argentine footballers
Association football midfielders
Argentine expatriate footballers
Expatriate footballers in Italy
Argentine expatriate sportspeople in Italy
San Lorenzo de Almagro footballers
Club Atlético Temperley footballers
Club Atlético Platense footballers
Club Atlético Atlanta footballers
A.S. Sambenedettese players
AZ Picerno players
Argentine Primera División players
Primera Nacional players
Serie C players